Animal Defenders International v United Kingdom [2013] ECHR 362 is United Kingdom constitutional law and a UK, European and international human rights case, on political spending at elections. It held that the United Kingdom's ban on spending money on political advertising, under the Communications Act 2003 section 321(2), was fully compatible with freedom of expression under the ECHR article 10.

While reflecting most of the election laws in the democratic world, the case stands in heavy contrast to Buckley v. Valeo and Citizens United v. FEC, as decided by majorities of the US Supreme Court, as well as Australian Capital Television v Commonwealth as decided by the majority of the High Court of Australia.

Facts
The UK's Communications Act 2003 section 321(2) bans political and industrial dispute related adverts. Animal Defenders International had an advertisement, not offensive, which was themed 'My Mate's a Primate'. The Broadcast Advertising Clearance Centre refused to let it show because it was deemed to fall within the prohibition on political advertising. They said this breached their ECHR article 10 right to freedom of expression.

Judgment

House of Lords
The House of Lords held unanimously that there was no breach of ECHR article 10, because the Communications Act 2003 was designed to level the playing field of expression, and therefore empower everyone's freedom of expression to the utmost.

Giving the leading judgment, Lord Bingham said the only issue (not interference, not legitimate aim pursued) was whether the restriction was 'necessary in a democratic society'. If views are debated then truth prevails over time, and the law was to ensure equality of debate. If parties can buy coverage proportionate to their resources, this would distort. The case of VgT Verein gegen Tierfabriken v Switzerland was considered, but found to be inapplicable to the British context, where the full strength of arguments against money in politics was considered.

Lord Scott, while concurring with the result, dissented on one point at paragraph 44, by suggesting that ECHR cases were not actually binding on the UK courts.

Baroness Hale gave a concurring judgment.

Lord Carswell and Lord Neuberger concurred with Lord Bingham.

European Court of Human Rights
By a bare majority (9:8), the European Court of Human Rights held the ban on political advertising under the Communications Act 2003 section 321(2) was fully compatible with ECHR article 10. The majority reasoned as follows.

In various dissents, a minority of the court, while stressing that money should never buy elections, objected to a total ban on spending.

See also
Campaign finance and Political finance
UK corporate law
Harper v. Canada [2004] SCR 827
Buckley v Valeo, 
Citizens United v FEC, US (2010)
McCutcheon v. FEC (2014) 
R (ProLife Alliance) v. BBC [2003] UKHL 23, BBC could refuse to broadcast graphic footage for an anti-abortion political party under the Broadcasting Act 1990 s 6(1)(a)
Political Parties, Elections and Referendums Act 2000 Schs 9 and 10
Companies Act 2006 ss 362–379

Notes

Human rights case law
United Kingdom constitutional case law